Events from the year 1710 in Canada.

Incumbents
French Monarch: Louis XIV
British and Irish Monarch: Anne

Governors
Governor General of New France: Philippe de Rigaud Vaudreuil
Colonial Governor of Louisiana: Daniel d'Auger de Subercase
Governor of Nova Scotia: Samuel Vetch
Governor of Plaisance: Philippe Pastour de Costebelle

Events
 The English recapture Acadia, this time permanently, and rename it Nova Scotia.
 Francis Nicholson captures Port Royal for England.
 The English take Port Royal and name it Annapolis Royal.
 Three Mohawk chiefs and one Mahican are received in Queen Anne's court in England as the Four Kings of the New World.

Births
 October 7 - François-Josué de la Corne Dubreuil, a soldier and trader. (died 1753)
 July 23 - Jonathan Belcher, lawyer, chief justice, and lieutenant governor of Nova Scotia (died 1776)

Historical documents
Squadron of Royal Navy ships and transports with 2,000 troops takes Port Royal from French garrison

Speaking to Queen Anne in London, Mohican and Kanien’kéhà:ka chiefs request conquest of Canada for their better hunting and trade

Haudenosaunee "inconstant in their Tempers, crafty, timorous, but quick of Apprehension, and very ingenious in their Way" (Note: stereotypes)

Governor Dudley says taking Canada and Nova Scotia will capture naval stores trade entirely and safeguard inland settlement

Argument for autumn offensive against Canada includes benefits of fairer winds and higher (but still ice-free) water

Detailed list of armaments and personnel in Canada from Riviere du Loup to Cataraqui on Lake Ontario

"A malignant fever[...]was very general both in Quebec and in the surrounding country [and] carried off a vast number of persons"

France has encroached on Newfoundland trade to point that "their riches and naval power[...]make all Europe stand in fear of them"

Newfoundlanders' work in fishery and demand for goods is strong, but conditions "very deplorable" from lack of protection from French

Geography of Ferryland, Newfoundland makes it excellent prospect for fortification to protect "every ship, stage, house and storehouse"

Mayors of English towns report how many ships will go to Newfoundland this year, and how much Royal Navy protection will be needed

References 

 
Canada
10